An irrigation sprinkler (also known as a water sprinkler or simply a sprinkler) is a device used to irrigate (water) agricultural crops, lawns, landscapes, golf courses, and other areas. They are also used for cooling and for the control of airborne dust. Sprinkler irrigation is the method of applying water in a controlled manner in way similar to rainfall. The water is distributed through a network that may consist of pumps, valves, pipes, and sprinklers. 

Irrigation sprinklers can be used for residential, industrial, and agricultural usage. It is useful on uneven land where sufficient water is not available as well as on sandy soil. The perpendicular pipes, having rotating nozzles on top, are joined to the main pipeline at regular intervals.
When water is pressurized through the main pipe it escapes from the rotating nozzles. It gets sprinkled on the crop. In sprinkler or overhead irrigation, water is piped to one more central locations within the field and distributed by overhead high pressure sprinklers or guns.

Types

Industrial 
Higher pressure sprinklers that themselves move in a circle are driven by a ball drive, gear drive, or impact mechanism (impact sprinklers). These can be designed to rotate in a full or partial circle.

In addition to irrigation, guns are used for industrial applications such as dust suppression and logging.

Many irrigation sprinklers are buried in the ground along with their supporting plumbing, although above ground and moving sprinklers are also common. Most irrigation sprinklers operate through electric and hydraulic technology and are grouped together in zones that can be collectively turned on and off by actuating a solenoid valve.

Residential

Home lawn sprinklers vary widely in their size, cost, and complexity. They include impact sprinklers, oscillating sprinklers, drip sprinklers, underground sprinkler systems, and portable sprinklers. Permanently installed systems may often operate on timers or other automated processes. They are occasionally installed with retractable heads for aesthetic and practical reasons, reducing damage during lawn mowing. These types of systems usually can be programmed to  start automatically on a set time and day each week.

Small portable sprinklers can be placed temporarily on lawns if additional watering is needed or if no permanent system is in place. These are often attached to an outdoor water faucet and are placed for a short period of time. Other systems may be professionally installed permanently in the ground and are attached permanently to a home's plumbing system. 

An antique sprinkler developed by Nomad called a 'set-and-forget tractor sprinkler' was used in Australia in the 1950s. Water pressure ensured that the sprinkler moved slowly across a lawn.

Agricultural science

The first use of sprinklers by farmers was some form of home and golf course type sprinklers. These ad hoc systems, while doing the job of the buried pipes and fixed sprinkler heads, interfered with cultivation and were expensive to maintain. 
Center-pivot irrigation was invented in 1940  by farmer Frank Zybach, who lived in Strasburg, Colorado.
In the 1950s, Stout-Wyss Irrigation System, a firm based in Portland, Oregon, developed a rolling pipe type irrigation system for farms that has become the most popular type for farmers irrigating large fields. With this system, large wheels attached to the large pipes with sprinkler heads move slowly across the field.

Underground
Underground sprinklers function through means of basic electronic and hydraulic technology. This valve and all of the sprinklers that will be activated by this valve are known as a zone. Upon activation, the solenoid, which sits on top of the valve is magnetized lifting a small stainless steel plunger in its center. By doing this, the activated (or raised) plunger allows water to escape from the top of a rubber diaphragm located in the center of the valve. Water that has been charged and waiting on the bottom of this same diaphragm now has the higher pressure and lifts the diaphragm. This pressurized water is then allowed to escape down stream of the valve through a series of pipes, usually made of PVC (higher pressure commercial systems) or polyethylene pipe (for typically lower pressure residential systems). At the end of these pipes and flush to ground level (typically) are pre measured and spaced out sprinklers. Use of indigenous materials also recommended.

Health risks
Water stagnating in a hose between uses, especially when warmed by the sun, can host the growth and interaction of Legionella and free-living amoebae (FLA) as biofilms on the inner surface of the hose. Clinical cases of Legionnaires' disease or Pontiac fever have been found to be associated with inhalation of garden hose aerosols containing Legionella bacteria. The report provides measured microbial densities resulting from controlled hose conditions in order to quantify the human health risks. The densities of Legionella spp. identified in two types of hoses were found to be similar to those reported during legionellosis outbreaks from other causes. It is proposed that the risk could be mitigated by draining hoses after use.

Gallery

See also
 Drip irrigation
 Feynman sprinkler
 Irrigation
 Sprinkler system timer

References

External links

Irrigation
Articles containing video clips
Gardening tools
Lawn sprinkler